Seawolf, Sea wolf or Sea Wolves may refer to:

Animals
 Sea wolf, a wolf subspecies found in the Vancouver coastal islands
 Seawolf (fish), a marine fish also known as wolffish or sea wolf
 A nickname of the killer whale
 South American sea lion, locally called lobo marino (sea wolf)

Arts and entertainment
 The Sea-Wolf, a 1904 novel by Jack London
 Seawolf (Wines), an organic winery in Yorkville Highlands, Mendocino
 U.S.S. Seawolf (novel), a 2000 novel by Patrick Robinson
 Sea Wolf (comics), a supervillain in the DC Comics
 Sea Wolf (band), a band led by Alex Brown Church, an indie folk musician

Films and television
 The Sea Wolf (1913 film), a lost silent film directed by Hobart Bosworth
 The Sea Wolf (1920 film), directed by George Melford
 The Sea Wolves (1925 film), a German silent film directed by Arthur Robison
 The Sea Wolf (1926 film), a silent film directed by Ralph Ince
 The Sea Wolf (1930 film), directed by Alfred Santell, starring Milton Sills, Raymond Hackett
 The Sea Wolf (1941 film), directed by Michael Curtiz, starring Edward G. Robinson, Ida Lupino
 The Sea Wolves, a 1980 British film directed by Andrew V. McLaglen, starring Gregory Peck, Roger Moore, David Niven
 Sea Wolves (film), a 1991 Hong Kong film, an instalment of the film series In the Line of Duty
 The Sea Wolf (1993 film), a TV film directed by Michael Anderson, starring Charles Bronson 
 Sea Wolf (miniseries), a 2009 two-part German/Canadian TV miniseries, directed by Michael Barker, starring Sebastian Koch, Tim Roth, Neve Campbell

Video games
 Sea Wolf (video game), a 1976 arcade game by Midway
 SSN-21 Seawolf, a 1994 computer game for MS-DOS

Military
 , a destroyer launched in 1918 and sold in 1931
 , a submarine launched in 1935 and sold in 1945
 , four US Navy submarines
 Seawolf-class submarine, a US Navy nuclear-powered fast attack submarine class built from 1989 to 2005
 Wolfpack Seewolf (German for Seawolf), a World War II German U-boat formation
 Consolidated TBY Sea Wolf, a United States Navy torpedo bomber of World War II
 Sea Wolf (missile), a British naval missile system
 HA(L)-3, a US Navy helicopter attack squadron nicknamed the Seawolves

Mythology
 Gonakadet, a mythical Sea-wolf of Tlingit tradition

People with the nickname
 John D. Bulkeley (1911–1996), American vice admiral
 Thomas Cochrane, 10th Earl of Dundonald (1775–1860), British naval officer and politician
 Will Tye (born 1991), American football tight end

Sports
 Erie SeaWolves, a minor league baseball team
 North Sound SeaWolves, a soccer team in Snohomish County, Washington
 Rostock Seawolves, a German basketball team
 Seattle Seawolves, a Major League Rugby team
 Sonoma State University Seawolves
 Stony Brook Seawolves, Stony Brook University's athletics teams
 Tabor Academy (Massachusetts) Seawolves
 University of Alaska Anchorage Seawolves
 Orlando SeaWolves, an indoor soccer team

Lists of people by nickname